Glusman is a surname. Notable people with the surname include:

John Glusman, editor and writer
Justyna Glusman (born 1974), Polish economist
Karl Glusman (born 1988), American actor